Verneuil-l'Étang is a commune in the Seine-et-Marne department in the Île-de-France region in north-central France. Verneuil-l'Étang station has rail connections to Provins, Longueville and Paris.

Demographics
Inhabitants of Verneuil-l'Étang are called Verneuillais.

See also
Communes of the Seine-et-Marne department

References

External links

1999 Land Use, from IAURIF (Institute for Urban Planning and Development of the Paris-Île-de-France région) 

Communes of Seine-et-Marne